Chanteurs Masqués is a Canadian French language reality singing competition television series based on the South Korean television series King of Mask Singer. The show features celebrities singing popular songs while wearing head-to-toe costumes and face masks concealing their identities. It employs panelists who guess the celebrities' identities by interpreting clues provided to them throughout the series.

Overview

Production 
In February 2021, it was announced that Quebecor Media had acquired the rights to air and produce The Masked Singer format in Canada. The series was confirmed to air on Quebecor’s production company Groupe TVA's network TVA in September 2021 after filming completed in August 2021.

Host and panelists 
Actor Guillaume Lemay-Thivierge was announced as the main host of the program, while the announced panelists consist of comedian , singer Véronic DiCaire, singer Marc Dupré, actress Anouk Meunier, and comedian Stéphane Rousseau.

Meunier won the Golden Ear as the panelist with the most correct guesses as to the identities of the performers throughout the season; however, Rousseau was the only panelist to correctly identify the final winners.

Response
In its year-end review of Canadian film and television in 2021, the trade magazine Playback named Chanteurs masqués the Unscripted Series of the Year.

Series overview

Season 1

Episodes

Week 1 (19 September)

Week 2 (23 September)

Week 3 (3 October)

Week 4 (10 October)

Week 5 (17 October)

Week 6 (24 October)

Week 7 (31 October)

Week 8 (7 November)  
 Group Performance: "I've Got the Music in Me" by The Kiki Dee Band/"Laissez-Moi Danser" by Dalida

Week 9 (14 November) 
Guest performance: "J'ai mangé trop de patates frites"/"Coton ouaté" by Bleu Jeans Bleu

Week 10 (21 November)

Week 11 (28 November) 
 Group Performance: "Incognito"/"Je danse dans ma tête" by Celine Dion (Final 3), "Oxygène" by Celine Dion (Harfang), "I Will Survive" by Gloria Gaynor (Dinde), "Tu t'en vas" by Alain Barrière (Inséparables), "The Final Countdown" by Europe (Final 3)

Season 2

Episodes

Episode 1 (18 September)

Episode 2 (25 September)

Episode 3 (2 October)

Episode 4 (9 October)

Episode 5 (16 October)

Episode 6 (23 October)

Episode 7 (30 October)

Episode 8 (6 November) 
 Group Performance: "Le Bal Masqué" by  La Compagnie Créole

Episode 9 (13 November) 
 Guest performance: "Alone" by Heart performed by Nick Carter as Sphynx Cat and "I Want It That Way" performed out of costume.

Episode 10 (20 November)

Episode 11 (27 November)

Episode 12 (4 December) 
Group Performance: "The Winner Takes It All" by ABBA (With guest appearance from final 3 from Season 1: Johanne Blouin (Wedding Owl), Jason Roy Léveillée (Black Turkey) and Wilfred Le Bouthillier & Marie-Élaine Thibert (Lovebirds))

References 

2021 Canadian television series debuts
2020s Canadian reality television series
Canadian television series based on South Korean television series
Masked Singer
Television shows filmed in Quebec
TVA (Canadian TV network) original programming